DOS 10 may refer to OS/2 versions:

 OS/2 1.0, "DOS" version 10.00 by Microsoft and IBM
 OS/2 1.1, "DOS" version 10.10 by Microsoft and IBM
 OS/2 1.2, "DOS" version 10.20 by Microsoft and IBM
 OS/2 1.3, "DOS" version 10.30 by IBM

See also
 DOS (disambiguation)
 DOS 1 (disambiguation)
 DOS 8 (disambiguation)
 DOS 20 (disambiguation)
 DOS 286 (disambiguation)